Gina Shay (born January 14, 1972) is an American producer at DreamWorks Animation specializing in animated feature films. Her multiple years of work in the animation field have afforded her much acclaim and has also, in 2011, resulted in her nomination for the Visual Effects Society Award for Outstanding Animation in an Animated Feature Motion Picture award due to her contributions for the 2010 film Shrek Forever After.

Most recently through Gina Shay's work as producer of DreamWorks' 2016 animated film Trolls, she has expressed owning a position that advocates for generating content that effects positive body images in youth. Gina Shay verbalized this notion at the DreamWorks Animation presentation in Hall H of the 2016 San Diego Comic-Con stating:

Shay is divorced from Ralph Bakshi's son, Preston. She started her career as a production assistant on Bakshi's 1992 film Cool World. Her son, Miles Bakshi, provided the voice for Tim Templeton in the DreamWorks Animation's film, The Boss Baby.

Filmography 

Producer

Animation department

Art department

Music department

Production manager

Soundtrack

Self

References

External links 

1972 births
Living people
American film producers
American women film producers
DreamWorks Animation people